Lynne Duval (née Robinson, born 21 June 1969) is an English former middle-distance runner. She finished fourth in the 800 metres final at the 1986 World Junior Championships and went on to win the 1500 metres title at the 1993 Universiade.

Career
A member of Coventry Godiva Harriers, Robinson was a successful junior who won the AAA Under 17 800 m title in 1984 and 1985, and finished fourth in the 800 metres final at the 1986 World Junior Championships in 2:02.18. Her best time for the 800 m was achieved on 26 July 1989 in Wythenshawe, when she ran 2:02.0.

Robinson won the 1992 UK Championships 800m title, narrowly defeating Coventry Godiva clubmate, Lorraine Baker, 2:04.47 to 2:04.52, and went on to finish fourth in the 800 m final at the 1992 AAA Championships/Olympic trials. The highlight of her career came when she won the 1500 metres title at the 1993 Universiade in Buffalo, New York, in a time of 4:12.03. Her 1500m best of 4:10.32 was set on 30 July 1994 in Hechtel.

Robinson has a PhD in Social History from Warwick University (1997) and is a lecturer at the University of Northampton.

International competitions

References

External links

Living people
1969 births
English female middle-distance runners
English women academics
English sociologists
Social historians
Alumni of the University of Warwick
Academics of Staffordshire University
Universiade gold medalists for Great Britain
Universiade medalists in athletics (track and field)
Competitors at the 1991 Summer Universiade
Medalists at the 1993 Summer Universiade